Saptamaruka Temple is Hindu temple in Jajpur in the Indian state of Odisha. Temple is dedicated to Hindu Tantric and Puranic goddesses Saptamatrikas.

President goddess
Legend says that these goddesses emanated from the body of devi Durga while killing Nishumbha and Shumbha. The matrikas represent the inner will power of their respective male God. Saptamatrikas are namely: Brahmani, Vaishnavi, Shivaduti or Indrani, Narasimhi, Chamunda, Kaumari and Varahi.

History
The temple was on a state of danger and later renovated by ASI, India. The deities were installed during Ashwamedha sacrifice of Yajati Keshari for protection. The design of the idols dates back to the 11th century AD. During the rule of Kala Chand in Murshidabad their armies came to destroy the Hindu temples in around Jajpur, then the Brahmins have hidden the images of Saptamatrikas in a tunnel near Baitarani River. Later the images were recovered and worshipped by Utkala Brahmins of Jajpur.

At Present
The renovated temple of Saptamatrikas lie on the south bank of Baitarani River in Jajpur. The Budha Ganesha Temple and Dashaswamedha Ghat are also adjacent to this shrine. People take a holy dip in Chaitra month during the Krishna paksha Chaturdasi with Shatabhisha nakshatra here. 
Regularly the goddesses are said to be attendants of goddess Viraja and protecting inhabitants of Jajpur.

See also
Budha Ganesha Temple
Yajna Varaha Temple
Biraja Temple

References
saptamatruka shrine photos
report on Shrine belonging to 11th Century

Hindu temples in Jajpur district
Shakti temples